Ivica Iliev (born 27 October 1979) is a  Serbian former professional footballer who played as a forward.

Club career
After starting out as a youngster at Rad, Iliev joined the youth system of Partizan in January 1996. He made his first-team debut under manager Ljubiša Tumbaković during the 1997–98 season, recording four league appearances in the process. In the following 1998–99 season, Iliev scored his first goals for Partizan, including a header in a 2–3 home loss to Lazio in the return leg of the UEFA Cup Winners' Cup second round. He later started playing more regularly, scoring eight league goals in the 1999–2000 season. After the departure of Mateja Kežman that summer, Iliev formed a strike partnership with Andrija Delibašić. They became a formidable duo in the following period, as the team won back-to-back championships in 2002 and 2003. In the 2003–04 UEFA Champions League third qualifying round, Iliev scored the only goal in a 1–0 return leg win against Newcastle United at St James' Park, resulting in a 1–1 draw on aggregate. Eventually, Partizan won the match 4–3 on penalties and reached the competition's group stage for the first time in the club's history.

In July 2004, Iliev went abroad and joined Italian side Messina on a free transfer. He made 29 appearances and scored once in his debut season in Serie A, as the club finished in a respectable seventh place. In January 2006, after receiving very little playing time, Iliev was loaned to Serie C1 side Genoa, helping them earn promotion to Serie B via the playoffs. He subsequently returned to Messina, but failed to help the team avoid relegation from Serie A in the 2006–07 campaign, finishing bottom of the table.

After three years in Italy, Iliev moved to Greece and signed with PAOK. He scored only one goal in the 2007–08 season, as the club failed to secure a spot in UEFA competitions. In August 2008, Iliev joined German side Energie Cottbus. He managed to score three Bundesliga goals from 27 games in the 2008–09 season. They were eventually relegated from the top flight after losing in the playoffs. In August 2009, Iliev signed with Israeli club Maccabi Tel Aviv on a one-year deal. He quickly became an important part of the team, but suffered an injury in January 2010, causing him to miss the remainder of the 2009–10 season.

On 21 July 2010, Iliev returned to his parent club Partizan on a one-year deal. He scored one goal in the Champions League preliminary phase, helping the side reach the group stage after seven years. With 13 goals, Iliev was the league's joint top scorer, being named in the competition's Team of the Season, while also collecting the double.

In June 2011, Iliev moved to Poland and signed a two-year contract with Wisła Kraków. He made a career-high 45 appearances and scored three goals across all competitions during his debut season. In the following 2012–13 campaign, Iliev netted four goals in 24 games, before being released by the Polish side.

International career
Iliev earned two caps for Serbia and Montenegro, making his international debut as a substitute for Goran Trobok in a 0–1 friendly loss at Germany on 30 April 2003. He scored a goal in his second appearance, a 3–4 friendly loss against Poland on 16 November 2003.

Post-playing career
On 27 October 2015, on his 36th birthday, Iliev was appointed as sporting director of Partizan. His most notable signings included Everton Luiz, Leonardo, Seydouba Soumah and Fousseni Diabaté. Iliev "resigned" from the position in March 2019 but he never ended up leaving the position and remained the sporting director until 27 July 2022 when he finally resigned.

Career statistics

Club

International

Honours

Club
Partizan
 First League of FR Yugoslavia: 1998–99, 2001–02, 2002–03
 FR Yugoslavia Cup: 1997–98, 2000–01
 Serbian SuperLiga: 2010–11
 Serbian Cup: 2010–11

Individual
 Serbian SuperLiga Top Scorer: 2010–11
 Serbian SuperLiga Team of the Season: 2010–11

Notes

References

External links

 
 
 
 
 

A.C.R. Messina players
Association football forwards
Association football wingers
Bundesliga players
Ekstraklasa players
Expatriate footballers in Germany
Expatriate footballers in Greece
Expatriate footballers in Israel
Expatriate footballers in Italy
Expatriate footballers in Poland
FC Energie Cottbus players
First League of Serbia and Montenegro players
FK Partizan non-playing staff
FK Partizan players
Genoa C.F.C. players
Israeli Premier League players
Maccabi Tel Aviv F.C. players
PAOK FC players
Serbia and Montenegro expatriate footballers
Serbia and Montenegro expatriate sportspeople in Italy
Serbia and Montenegro international footballers
Serbia and Montenegro under-21 international footballers
Serbia and Montenegro footballers
Serbian expatriate footballers
Serbian expatriate sportspeople in Germany
Serbian expatriate sportspeople in Greece
Serbian expatriate sportspeople in Israel
Serbian expatriate sportspeople in Italy
Serbian expatriate sportspeople in Poland
Serbian footballers
Serbian people of Macedonian descent
Serbian SuperLiga players
Serie A players
Footballers from Belgrade
Super League Greece players
Wisła Kraków players
1979 births
Living people